Mount Broome is a mountain in the north part of the range which lies between the mouths of Douglas Glacier and Bryan Glacier in the Werner Mountains, Palmer Land. It was mapped by the United States Geological Survey from ground surveys and from U.S. Navy air photos, 1961–67, and named by the Advisory Committee on Antarctic Names for Howard W. Broome, Jr., electrician with the South Pole Station winter party in 1967.

References
 

Mountains of Palmer Land